Hồ Văn Ý (born 1 January 1997) is a Vietnamese futsal player who plays as a goalkeeper for Thái Sơn Nam and Vietnam national futsal team.

Career 
On 1 January 1997, he was born in Quảng Nam, Vietnam. He played for Hoàng Thư Đà Nẵng from 2015 to 2017. After that, he has joined Thái Sơn Nam since 2018 and became the most important goalkeeper of club.

In 2018, he achieved success with Thái Sơn Nam by reaching to 2018 AFC Futsal Club Championship final. In this tournament, he scored a goal against Nagoya Oceans in the quarter-final to help Thái Sơn Nam beat them 3-2. Thanks to this performance, he was nominated 1 of 10 best goalkeepers of the World Futsal 2018

Title 
 Individual
 Best Goalkeeper in the World (Nominee): 2018, 2021
 Vietnam Futsal Golden Ball: 2021
 Vietnam Futsal Silver Ball: 2018, 2020
 Clubs
 Vietnam Futsal League champion: 2018, 2019, 2020
 Vietnamese National Futsal Cup champion: 2018, 2020
 AFC Futsal Club Championship runner-up: 2018
 National Team
AFF Futsal Championship
2019: Third place

References

1997 births
Living people
Futsal goalkeepers
Vietnamese men's futsal players
People from Quảng Nam province